Demon prince or prince demon may refer to:

 Classification of demons
 Demon Princes, a series of science-fiction novels
 The Demon Prince of Momochi House, a Japanese romance manga
 Demon Prince Enma, a Japanese horror anime and manga
 Prince demons, a type of monsters in the Dungeons & Dragons setting

See also 

 Demon
 Demonology
 Warhammer Fantasy (setting)
 List of Dungeons & Dragons deities